Yebes Observatory (Spanish: Centro Astronómico de Yebes (CAY)) is an astronomical observatory located at Yebes, Castilla-La Mancha, Spain.

Yebes Observatory is the main scientific and technical facility of the National Geographic Institute of Spain.

The facilities include two radio telescopes, a solar tower, an astrograph and a Gravimeter. The most powerful telescope is the RT40 m telescope.

References 

Astronomical observatories in Spain
Buildings and structures in the Province of Guadalajara